Joseph Burchard Villiger  (May 14, 1819 – November 5, 1902) was appointed Santa Clara University's fourth president in 1861 after the presidency of Felix Cicaterri. Burchard Villiger had served as the president of two Jesuit Colleges in the east. During his presidency at Santa Clara University in California United States he had built the Science Building, a Jesuit Residence, and the Facade of the Old Mission Church. He served as president till 1865 which coincided with the Civil War. Later Villiger was rector of the College of the Sacred Heart in Woodstock, Maryland.

In 1857, Villiger was appointed president of Washington Seminary (later known as Gonzaga College High School) in Washington, D.C., succeeding Hippolyte J. De Neckere. His presidency came in an end the following year, and he was succeeded by Charles H. Stonestreet.

Early life 
Burchard Villiger was born on the morning of May 14, 1819, in Auw, Aargau, Switzerland. That afternoon, he was baptized at the local parish church by the pastor, a Benedictine priest from Engelberg Abbey, and he was given the Christian name of Joseph Burchard. Afterwards, he was offered up to the Virgin Mary at the high altar. Villiger was confirmed by the Apostolic Nuncio to Switzerland, Archbishop , when he was eighteen months old at a church in the town of Cham.

Villiger had five siblings. His older sister, Mary, became a Benedictine nun at the Sarnen Abbey, and his younger sister, married. His three younger brothers also married and had families. 

From the age of five and a half, Villiger attended parochial school, and he received his First Communion when he was eight years old. Shortly after his First Communion, he went with his mother and sister on a  pilgrimage to the Marian shrine at Einsiedeln Abbey. When he was 11 years old, Villiger was sent to live with his cousin, a priest, in Abtwyl to pursue higher studies and discern a religious vocation. The following year, he began his classical studies as a boarding student at Muri Abbey. After three years of study, the Swiss government prohibited Catholic monks from teaching, and Villiger continued his studies at a gymnasium in Zug, which was taught by secular priests. The Jesuits opened a college in Schwyz that year, and Villiger enrolled.

In August 1838, after completing his study of rhetoric, Villiger applied to join the Society of Jesus. He was admitted on October 4, and proceeded to the Jesuit novitiate in Brig-Glis, Valais. On October 10, 1840, he professed his vows at the novitiate. In 1842, Villiger went to Fribourg to study philosophy and physics and in 1844, returned to Jesuit college in Schwyz as the first prefect and as a teacher of mathematics. The following year, he returned to Fribourg to study theology.

The Sonderbund War broke out in 1845, and Villiger was forced out of Fribourg with all his fellow Jesuits.

He then went to Solothurn and awaited orders from the Jesuit provincial superior.

Washington and Maryland 
Villiger became the president of the Washington Seminary, later known as Gonzaga College High School, on August 15, 1857, succeeding Hippolyte J. De Neckere. Villiger's tenure was short-lived, lasting only nine months, because on April 25, 1858, he was named to succeed Charles H. Stonestreet as the provincial superior of the Jesuit Maryland Province, and Stonestreet replaced him as president.

Villiger's term as provincial came to an end on November 28, 1859, with the arrival of Felix Sopranis as the Jesuit visitor for North America.

Santa Clara College 
On May 21, 1861, Villiger arrived at Santa Clara College, succeeding Felix Cicaterri as its president. He found the school $30,000 in debt, .

Later years 
Villiger died on November 5, 1902, in Philadelphia.

Saint Joseph's College 
Villiger Hall opened in 2012 as a student dormitory named in his honor.

Notes

References

Citations

Sources

Further reading
 

1819 births
1902 deaths
19th-century American Jesuits
19th-century Italian Jesuits
Santa Clara University faculty
Santa Clara University people
Presidents of Gonzaga College High School
Presidents of Santa Clara University
Presidents of Saint Joseph's University
Presidents of the University of San Francisco
Rectors of Woodstock College
Swiss emigrants to the United States
Pastors of St. John the Evangelist Catholic Church (Frederick, Maryland)